Gowthami Express is a train running from the port city of Kakinada to , Hyderabad. It is named after the River Gowthami, a tributary to the River Godavari. It runs with train numbers as 12737/12738.

History

Gowthami Superfast Express was introduced on 3 October 1987 and is considered as a sister train to Godavari Express which runs between Visakhapatnam and Hyderabad. It was considered to be one of the most prestigious trains of the South Central Railway (SCR), and connects Hyderabad with the port city Kakinada

The Gowthami Superfast Express is considered to be one of the best ways to commute to the  state capital, in united Andhra Pradesh, Hyderabad from Delta districts of Andhra Pradesh. People of Kakinada, Rajahmundry, Tadepalligudem, and Eluru prefer the Gowthami Express to travel to Secunderabad. It was upgraded to superfast category in July 2007. It is operated with 12737 / 12738 as train numbers; it used to be 7047 / 7048 prior to being upgraded.

It is one of the longest trains running with 24 coaches and also runs with full capacity throughout the year. Currently, it has two first class cum second class air conditioned coaches, two second class air conditioned coaches, two third class air conditioned coaches, 13 sleeper class, three second class general compartments and two luggage cum brake vans. In total it has six air conditioned coaches. It was the first train in South Central Railway zone (before been transfer to South Coast Railway) to run with two first class cum second class air conditioned coaches. It has such a huge patronage such that a supplementary train, Cocanada AC Express, a fully air conditioned train, was introduced between Kakinada and Lingampalli in 2012 to cater to the rush. Both these trains run jam packed almost throughout the year.

Gowthami Express is expected to run with 26 coaches very soon, and it will be the first train in SCoR and one among very few in Indian Railways to do so. It is also known for best maintenance of coaches and it was considered as a model rake of South Central Railway, Vijayawada Railway Division (but now it is in SCoR).

Stoppage at Vijayawada junction has been officially removed from time table of the train.

Loco links
The train is regularly hauled by a Lalaguda-based WAP-7 locomotive from COA. There is no loco reversal, since this train is taking a bypass route near BZA.

Incidents

In July, 2008 Gowthami Express supposedly was short-circuited and fire accident broke out during the night. Those wakened by the sounds escaped by pulling the emergency chain to slow down the train. 40 people died in this incident. It occurred while the train crossed Kesamudram station in Warangal district at around 01:07.

See also

References

Named passenger trains of India
Rail transport in Telangana
Express trains in India